Jacob Thomas White (1764 – 21 November 1831) was a professional cricketer who played for Middlesex in the late 18th century.

Jacob White is known to have played in two first-class cricket matches in 1789 and 1791, both of which also featured W. White.  He is further recorded in four matches playing for Brentford and Richmond in 1799 and 1800.

References

External sources
 CricketArchive record of Jacob White

Further reading
 G B Buckley, Fresh Light on 18th Century Cricket, Cotterell, 1935
 Arthur Haygarth, Scores & Biographies, Volume 1 (1744–1826), Lillywhite, 1862

English cricketers
English cricketers of 1787 to 1825
Middlesex cricketers
1764 births
1831 deaths